Ima nešto u tom što me nećeš is a 2005 album by Željko Joksimović, one of the most popular Serbian pop stars.

Track listing
"Ima nešto u tom što me nećeš"
"Milo za drago"
"Michelle"
"Mila moja"
"Crnokosa"
"Zovi me"
"Louis Francis"
"Ne treba ti neko kao ja"
"Lutko moja"
"Lud i ponosan" 
"Idi na put (Jamais)"

2005 albums